Penck Glacier is a small glacier flowing northward along the west side of Bertrab Nunatak to Vahsel Bay. Discovered by the German Antarctic Expedition, 1911–12, under Wilhelm Filchner, who named this feature for German geographer Albrecht Penck.

See also
 List of glaciers in the Antarctic

References

 

Glaciers of Coats Land